George Gerhard Ruetz (September 23, 1893 – May 24, 1927) was a professional football coach in the National Football League for the Racine Legion. Prior to that he had been one of Racine's finest amateur players from about 1910-1920. In June 1922 George traveled to Canton, Ohio and made a $100.00 payment to secure the Legion franchise in the newly formed NFL. He also served as the team's general manager in 1922 and 1923. Outside of football, George owned and operated a grocery store in Racine. He scheduled the Legion's very first NFL game, played against the Chicago Bears.

Family
George's son, Howard, would go on to play for the Green Bay Packers from 1951–1953.

References

Racine Legion Bio
Joe Ruetz Obituary

1893 births
1927 deaths
Players of American football from Wisconsin
Racine Legion coaches